Metacyrba punctata (Dwarf Aztec Jumping Spider) is a species of jumping spider. It is found from the southern United States to Ecuador.

References

Further reading

 

Salticidae
Articles created by Qbugbot
Spiders described in 1894